Ptochiomera nodosa is a species of dirt-colored seed bug in the family Rhyparochromidae. It is found in Central America and North America.

References

External links

 

Rhyparochromidae
Articles created by Qbugbot
Insects described in 1832